Kingfield or King Field may refer to the following places:
Kingfield, Maine, a New England town
Kingfield (CDP), Maine, the main village in the town
King Field, Minneapolis, Minnesota, a neighborhood
Kingfield, an area of Woking, Surrey, England
Kingfield Stadium, Woking

See also 
Kingfield and Dead River Railway, Maine
Kingsfield (disambiguation)
King's Field